Poraiyahat is a town in the Poraiyahat community division block in the Godda district of Jharkhand, India.

Geography

Location
Poraiyahat is a town located on the north-east border of Bihar and Jharkhand.

Overview
The Rajmahal hills run from the bank of the Ganges in the extreme north to the south into the Dumka district. The entire area is mostly rural, with only small pockets of urbanisation.

Demographics 
According to the 2011 Census of India, Poraiyahat had a total population of 6,319, of which 3,296 (52%) were males and 3,023 (48%) were females. 876 people were in the age range 0–6 years. The total number of literate persons in Poraiyahat was 4,106 (75.44% of the population over six years).

Transport
The Deoghar-Godda-Pirpainti NH 133 passes through Poraiyahat, and connects to the Farakka-Arwal NH 33 at Pirpainti.

The 30 km Hansdiha-Godda rail, part of the Eastern Railway, passes through Poraiyahat.

References

Cities and towns in Godda district